Paramatachia is a genus of Australian intertidal spiders that was first described by R. de Dalmas in 1918.

Species
 it contains five species:
Paramatachia ashtonensis Marples, 1962 – Australia (New South Wales)
Paramatachia cataracta Marples, 1962 – Australia (New South Wales)
Paramatachia decorata Dalmas, 1918 (type) – Australia (Queensland)
Paramatachia media Marples, 1962 – Australia (Victoria)
Paramatachia tubicola (Hickman, 1950) – Australia (South Australia, Tasmania)

References

Araneomorphae genera
Desidae
Spiders of Australia